The Kettles are a chain of four small alpine glacial lakes in Custer County, Idaho, United States, located in the White Cloud Mountains in the Sawtooth National Recreation Area.  The lakes are located in the upper portion of the Big Boulder Creek watershed east of D. O. Lee Peak in the uppermost portion of the Big Boulder Lakes Basin.  Sawtooth National Forest trail 601 along leads to the Big Boulder Lakes.

References

See also

 List of lakes of the White Cloud Mountains
 Sawtooth National Forest
 Sawtooth National Recreation Area
 White Cloud Mountains

Lakes of Idaho
Lakes of Custer County, Idaho
Glacial lakes of the United States
Sawtooth National Forest